In enzymology, a dehydrogluconokinase is an enzyme that catalyzes the chemical reaction

ATP + 2-dehydro-D-gluconate  ADP + 6-phospho-2-dehydro-D-gluconate

Thus, the two substrates of this enzyme are ATP and 2-dehydro-D-gluconate, whereas its two products are ADP and 6-phospho-2-dehydro-D-gluconate.

This enzyme belongs to the family of transferases, specifically those transferring phosphorus-containing groups (phosphotransferases) with an alcohol group as acceptor.  The systematic name of this enzyme class is ATP:2-dehydro-D-gluconate 6-phosphotransferase. Other names in common use include ketogluconokinase, 2-ketogluconate kinase, ketogluconokinase (phosphorylating), and 2-ketogluconokinase.  This enzyme participates in pentose phosphate pathway.

References

 

EC 2.7.1
Enzymes of unknown structure